Bolbochromus lineatus, is a species of dor beetle endemic to Sri Lanka.

References 

Bolboceratidae
Insects of Sri Lanka
Insects described in 1848